The Para World Sailing Championships is an annual World Championship multi-class sailing regatta in para classes organised by the World Sailing.

Editions

Medalists

2.4 Metre

SKUD 18

Sonar

Men's Hansa 303

Women's Hansa 303

References

World championships in sailing
World Sailing